Cato is an unincorporated community in Jefferson Township, Pike County, in the U.S. state of Indiana.

History
A post office was established at Cato in 1894, and remained in operation until it was discontinued in 1903. According to Ronald L. Baker, the community may be named after Cato, New York.

Geography

References

Unincorporated communities in Pike County, Indiana
Unincorporated communities in Indiana